RNA polymerase II subunit A C-terminal domain phosphatase is an enzyme that in humans is encoded by the CTDP1 gene.

This gene encodes a protein which interacts with the carboxy-terminus of transcription initiation factor TFIIF, a transcription factor which regulates elongation as well as initiation by RNA polymerase II. The protein may also represent a component of an RNA polymerase II holoenzyme complex. Alternative splicing of this gene results in two transcript variants encoding 2 different isoforms.

Interactions
CTDP1 has been shown to interact with WD repeat-containing protein 77, GTF2F1 and POLR2A.

References

External links

Further reading